Brage is a Norwegian masculine given name originating from the Old Norse name Bragi, developing from the word "bragr" meaning poetry. As of January 2019, there were 2 813  men who had Brage as first name in Norway.

Notable people 
Notable Norwegians with the given name include;
 , a Norwegian activist and editor
 Brage Bråten Richenberg, a Norwegian snowboarder
 Brage Sandmoen, a Norwegian football referee
 , a Norwegian politician

References 

Norwegian masculine given names